Mario Llamas (30 March 1928 – 17 June 2014) was a tennis player from Mexico.

Career
Llamas was a regular fixture on the Mexico Davis Cup team, appearing in a total of 21 ties during his career. He won 21 of his 44 rubbers, 15 of them in singles. In the 1962 Davis Cup, Llamas was a member of the team that finished as the runner-up. Although he did not play in the final against Australia, he took part in the America Zone and Inter-Zone finals. He had a win over Rod Laver in a 1959 Davis Cup match.

At the 1960 Wimbledon Championships he had wins over Barry Phillips-Moore, Warren Woodcock and Roger Becker, before losing in the round of 16 to Roy Emerson. He also made the fourth round of the 1961 French Championships, where he was seeded 13th.

Llamas was a gold medalist in the men's doubles at the 1955 Pan American Games, with Gustavo Palafox as his partner. In the 1963 Pan American Games he took home a silver medal in the singles, after losing to gold medal playoff to Ronald Barnes.

his other career singles highlights include winning the Pan American Championships on clay courts at Centro Deportivo Chapultepec, Mexico City three times (1958–59, 1963).

Llamas died on 17 June 2014 at the age of 86.

References

External links
 

1928 births
2014 deaths
Mexican male tennis players
Tennis players from Mexico City
Tennis players at the 1955 Pan American Games
Tennis players at the 1963 Pan American Games
Pan American Games gold medalists for Mexico
Pan American Games silver medalists for Mexico
Pan American Games medalists in tennis
Central American and Caribbean Games gold medalists for Mexico
Central American and Caribbean Games medalists in tennis
Tennis players at the 1951 Pan American Games
Medalists at the 1955 Pan American Games
Medalists at the 1963 Pan American Games
20th-century Mexican people